Avant Festival (Avantfest, Avant Fest, Фестиваль Авант) was an annual international music festival, which takes place in Russia. The festival began in 2004 and ran until 2013 in various venues in Moscow. However, the festival ceased and picked back up in 2016, with plans on holding another full-scale festival in 2017.

Overview and history 

Avantfest was held for the first time in Moscow in May of 2004. The headliners for the 2004 festival were Russian band Tequilajazzz and American band Xiu Xiu.

The festival hosted numerous Russian indie bands and foreign acts, including Mudhoney, Explosions in the Sky, The Horrors, Yann Tiersen, Devendra Banhart, Swans, Mudhoney, Liars, Patrick Wolf, Spiritualized, Chinawoman, Jamie Lidell, Arab Strap, Xiu Xiu, Deerhoof, Notwist, Lali Puna, And you will know us by the trail of dead, Lou Rhodes, 65daysofstatic, Yoav, Silver Apples, I Am Kloot, Jarboe, We Have Band, CocoRosie, Why?, Oceansize, etc. 2013 was the 10th year in a row that the festival was staged.

Events (by year)

Avantfest 2004 
The inaugural festival was held in several venues in Moscow like the One Actor Theater and featured groups such as Funkstörung and Sufjan Stevens.

Avantfest 2005 
The number of events greatly increased from the year before, with locations including "35mm" and Club "Orange," although most were held at the latter location.

Avantfest 2016 
In 2016 Avantfest was held in the cultural center TEXTIL in the city of Yaroslavl.

References

Music festivals in Russia

Rock festivals in Russia
Music festivals established in 2004